Neville Mckoy (4 August 1946 – 11 February 1988) was a Jamaican cricketer. He played in five first-class matches for the Jamaican cricket team from 1970 to 1973.

See also
 List of Jamaican representative cricketers

References

External links
 

1946 births
1988 deaths
Jamaican cricketers
Jamaica cricketers
Sportspeople from Kingston, Jamaica